James Vincent O'Keefe (born 2 April 1957) is an English former professional footballer. He played as a goalkeeper for a number of Football League clubs between 1974 and 1993, making over 400 appearances.

Blackpool
O'Keefe had two loan stints at Blackpool during the 1980s. The first occurred during the 1986-87 campaign, when he deputised for Barry Siddall in a 4–1 victory at Chester City on 27 December.

Two years later, Sam Ellis brought him back for a further six League games.

Blackburn Rovers
A highly talented and well respected 
keeper, O'Keefe had his arguably greatest moment in a Blackburn shirt as he helped the team win the now defunct Full Members Cup at the old Wembley Stadium, beating Charlton Athletic 1–0 in 1987. Vince is the father of current Chorley F.C. midfielder Josh O'Keefe.

After Football
Vince became a financial consultant based around Nottingham and has acted as a financial advisor for the PFA. He is also a football agent to the likes of Ben Foster.

References
Specific

General

1957 births
Living people
English footballers
Association football goalkeepers
Birmingham City F.C. players
Peterborough United F.C. players
Walsall F.C. players
Exeter City F.C. players
Torquay United F.C. players
Blackburn Rovers F.C. players
Bury F.C. players
Blackpool F.C. players
Wrexham A.F.C. players
Leamington F.C. players
English Football League players
Footballers from Birmingham, West Midlands